April Skies is the 8th studio album by the electronic band Deine Lakaien. It was released in 2005.

Track listing
 "Over and Done" – 5:12
 "Slowly Comes My Night" – 4:24
 "Secret Hideaway" – 4:19
 "Supermarket (My Angel)" – 5:23
 "Midnight Sun" – 4:25
 "Satellite" – 4:43
 "Take a Chance" – 4:53
 "Heart Made to Be Mine" – 4:01
 "Vivre" – 5:39
 "When You Lose" – 3:52
 "Through the Hall" – 6:09
 "Dialectic" – 4:34
 "Falling" (bonus track, only on ltd. Edition)

Guest musicians
B. Deutung, Ivee Leon, Sharifa, Robert Wilcocks

Issues with CD

The cd April Skies released on Capital-EMI contains cd Copying Protection, many people have found that this cd will not play on their car cd-players or in certain stereos. Further, in order to play on ones computer, the cd insists on installing its own sub-par cd-player software. Attempts to "crack" the software have received little success. This copy-protection which prevents purchasers from putting the music onto the MP3 player has caused a fan backlash against EMI records with many websites dedicated to people ranting about this problem.

2005 albums
Deine Lakaien albums
Dark wave albums